Elisedd ap Gwylog (died c. 755), also known as Elise, was king of Powys in eastern Wales, son of Gwylog ap Beli.

Little has been preserved in the historical records about Elisedd, who was an ancestor of Brochwel Ysgithrog. He appears to have reclaimed the territory of Powys after it had been overrun by the English. His great-grandson, Cyngen ap Cadell erected a column in his memory which stands not far from the later abbey of Valle Crucis. This is known as the Pillar of Eliseg, but the form Eliseg which appears on the column is thought to be a mistake by the carver of the inscription.  

The Latin inscription on the pillar is now very hard to read, but was apparently clearer in the time of Edward Lhuyd, who transcribed it. The translation of the part of the inscription referring to Elisedd is as follows:

 + Concenn son of Catell, Catell son of Brochmail, Brochmail son of Eliseg, Eliseg son of Guoillauc.
 + And that Concenn, great-grandson of Eliseg, erected this stone for his great-grandfather Eliseg.
 + The same Eliseg, who joined together the inheritance of Powys . . . out of the power of the Angles with his sword and with fire.
 + Whosoever repeats the writing, let him give a blessing on the soul of Eliseg.

Some old poems refer to Elisedd and assert he had a "special crown, a chain of twisted gold links, and armlets and anklets of gold which were the badges of sovereignty of Powys". These artifacts have disappeared from history but perhaps resurfaced briefly during the coronation of Owain Glyndŵr in 1400.

Elisedd was succeeded by his son Brochfael ap Elisedd.

References

John Edward Lloyd (1911) A history of Wales from the earliest times to the Edwardian conquest (Longmans, Green & Co.)

Monarchs of Powys
Elisedd
8th-century Welsh monarchs
750s deaths

Year of birth unknown
Year of death uncertain